The Acro II is a two-seat aerobatic sportsplane  designed by US aviation enthusiast Paul Poberezny in the 1970s for amateur construction.  It is an enlarged version of his previous Acro Sport I, sized up to carry two persons.  Plans are available through Acro Sport in Wisconsin and material kits are supplied by Aircraft Spruce and Specialty.

Design and development
The Acro Sport II is a short-span biplane of conventional taildragger configuration, typically built with open cockpits and spatted main undercarriage.  Its structure is fabric-covered, steel tube fuselage and tail group, with wood wing structure.

Operational history
In March 2017, 83 examples were on the Federal Aviation Administration aircraft registry in the United States, although 129 had at one time been registered. In Canada in March 2017 there were 11 registered with Transport Canada.

Variants
Acro Sport I
Single place version of the Acro Sport

Specifications

See also

References

External links

Acro Sport II
Single-engined tractor aircraft
Biplanes
Homebuilt aircraft
1970s United States sport aircraft
Poberezny aircraft
Aerobatic aircraft